Palgrave is a rural locality in the Southern Downs Region, Queensland, Australia.

History 
The locality takes its name from the parish name, which in turn is thought to be named after an officer of the Aberdeen Company operating  several pastoral runs in the area or after a senior public servant.

References 

Southern Downs Region
Localities in Queensland